Saša Prokofjev (born 28 November 1971) is a Slovenian sprinter. She competed in the women's 4 × 400 metres relay at the 2000 Summer Olympics.

References

1971 births
Living people
Athletes (track and field) at the 2000 Summer Olympics
Slovenian female sprinters
Olympic athletes of Slovenia
Place of birth missing (living people)